The Lipton Challenge Cup also known as Coppa Lipton was a football competition competed between clubs from Southern Italy and Sicily. It was played during the period leading up to World War I when football in the country was still in its infancy.

History
The competition was organised by Sir Thomas Lipton of the world famous Lipton Tea brand. In the final most commonly were Palermo FBC and Naples FBC, however, US Internazionale Napoli and Messina FC (also known as SG Garibaldi Messina) competed in the competition at various points too.

Winners

References

See also
Copa Lipton
Sir Thomas Lipton Trophy

Defunct Italian football friendly trophies
1908–09 in Italian football
1909–10 in Italian football
1910–11 in Italian football
1911–12 in Italian football
1912–13 in Italian football
1913–14 in Italian football